Ethylhexyl palmitate, or octyl palmitate, is the fatty acid ester derived from 2-ethylhexanol and palmitic acid.  Ethylhexyl palmitate is commonly used in cosmetic formulations.

Chemical structure
Ethylhexyl palmitate is a branched saturated fatty ester derived from ethylhexyl alcohol and palmitic acid.

Physical properties
Ethylhexyl palmitate is a clear, colorless liquid at room temperature with a slightly fatty odor.

Palmitic acid and 2-ethylhexanol are reacted in the presence of an acid catalyst to make the ester.

Uses
Ethylhexyl palmitate is used in cosmetic formulations as a solvent, carrying agent, pigment wetting agent, fragrance fixative and emollient.  Its dry-slip skinfeel is similar to some silicone derivatives.

References

Cosmetics chemicals
Fatty acid esters
Lipids
Palmitate esters